List of Ghostbusters episodes may refer to:
List of The Ghost Busters episodes, aired 1975
List of Filmation's Ghostbusters episodes, aired 1986
List of The Real Ghostbusters episodes, aired 1986–1991